INS Kalinga is an Indian Navy establishment reporting to the Eastern Naval Command. It is responsible for preparing, storing and delivering advanced missiles to ships of the Eastern Fleet. INS Kalinga was commissioned on 21 November 1985. Over the past 36 years, the establishment has grown into a fully-fledged Station with co-located units such as MARCOS (E), NAD (V), NAI (V) and MES. The station is spread over an area of 734.1 acres and consists of over 900 service and civilian personnel with their families. INS Kalinga is located on the Visakhapatnam - Bheemunipatnam beach road about 40 kilometers northeast of the Visakhapatnam Naval Base. 
 
The establishment has married accommodations for officers, sailors, DSC personnel and civilians. It has medical facilities at a sickbay, LCA auditorium and community hall for movie and general activities, a Library-with-reading room, and KV and NKG schools for education facilities. In the field of sport, it has a badminton court, tennis court, basketball court, football ground, volleyball court and swimming pool. Kalinga station has night landing facilities at an existing helipad.

See also
 Indian navy 
 List of Indian Navy bases
 List of active Indian Navy ships

 Integrated commands and units
 Armed Forces Special Operations Division
 Defence Cyber Agency
 Integrated Defence Staff
 Integrated Space Cell
 Indian Nuclear Command Authority
 Indian Armed Forces
 Special Forces of India

 Other lists
 Strategic Forces Command
 List of Indian Air Force stations
 List of Indian Navy bases
 India's overseas military bases

References

Kalinga